The discography for Canadian country singer Lisa Brokop include nine albums and 35 singles. In 1991, Brokop issued her debut album, My Love, on the independent label Libre Records in Canada. 

It was in 1994, Brokop signed with Patriot Records, a label owned by Liberty Records and released her second album Every Little Girl's Dream in both Canada and the United States. The album was certified Gold by the CRIA, for sales of 50,000 copies, in October 1995. Lisa Brokop followed in 1996 on Capitol Nashville, the album's commercial failure in both Canada and U.S. forced Brokop and Capitol to part ways.

In 1998, Brokop signed with Columbia Records and released the Canadian only release, When You Get to Be You. The album was scheduled for release in the United States, but due to all singles failing at radio, the album was never released. Undeniable, was issued in 2000 on the independent Cosmo Records label. 

Five years after the release of her previous album, Brokop returned with Hey, Do You Know Me released in 2005 on Curb Records in Canada. Brokop's most recent album, The Patsy Cline Project, was issued in 2015.

Studio albums

1990s

2000s and 2010s

Singles

1990s

2000s to present

As a featured artist

Singles as The Jeffersons

Music videos

Notes

References

Country music discographies
Discographies of Canadian artists